Sir George Frederick Stanley  (14 October 1872 – 1 July 1938) was a British soldier and Conservative Party politician who served as a member of the UK Parliament for Preston and later, Willesden East. He also served the Governor of Madras from 1929 to 1934 and as Acting Viceroy of India in 1934.

Life
The sixth son of Frederick Stanley, 16th Earl of Derby, Stanley was educated at Wellington College and at the Royal Military Academy, Woolwich. In 1903 he married Lady Beatrix Taylour, youngest daughter of the 3rd Marquess of Headfort. He was the grandson of Edward Smith-Stanley, the former British Prime Minister.

He entered the Royal Horse Artillery in 1893 and was promoted to Captain in 1900. He served in the Second Boer War in 1899–1900 and was Adjutant with the Honourable Artillery Company from 1904 to 1909. He later served in World War I and was mentioned in despatches and awarded the CMG in 1916.

He was Conservative Member of Parliament for Preston from 1910 to 1922 and for Willesden East from 1924 to 1929.

He held office as Comptroller of the Household from 1919 until 1921, as Financial Secretary to the War Office from 1921 to 1922, Parliamentary Under-Secretary of State for the Home Department from 1922 to 1923, Parliamentary Secretary to the Ministry of Pensions from 1924 to 1929. He was Governor of Madras from 1929 to 1934.

He was appointed a Privy Counsellor in 1927 and made a Knight Grand Commander of the Order of the Indian Empire (GCIE) in 1929 and a Knight Grand Commander of the Order of the Star of India in 1934.

As Governor of Madras 

Stanley was appointed Governor of Madras on 26October 1929 at an annual salary of  1,20,000. He arrived in India and took over as governor on 12November 1929.

Stanley assumed the governorate at a critical juncture. The Great Depression had just begun and the economy was deteriorating. The Premier P. Subbarayan resigned after the 1930 elections when his party was voted out. The Swaraj Party boycotted the elections as a part of the Civil Disobedience Movement and the Justice Party was voted to power in the 1930 and 1934 elections. B. Munuswamy Naidu served as Premier from 1930 to 1932 but he had to resign in 1932 due to the strong opposition of landowning elements in the party. Naidu was succeeded by Ramakrishna Ranga Rao of Bobbili whose administration soon became notorious for mis-governance.

During his tenure as governor, Stanley was responsible for implementing the Mettur Dam across the Kaveri River. The project's inauguration on 21August 1934, was attended by people from all parts of the Presidency. The reservoir created by the Dam was named Stanley Reservoir in his honour. On 17January 1930, Stanley laid the foundation stone of a Gaudiya Math and a temple at Royapettah, Madras. The first service of the Madras sub-urban line of the South Indian Railway Company was flagged off by Stanley from Chennai Beach railway station on 2April 1931. In 1933, Stanley inaugurated the five-year medicine and surgery diploma course at the Royapuram Medical College. On 2July 1938, the school was renamed Stanley Medical College in his honour. In 1931, he had received Ignatius Elias III, the Patriarch of Antioch on his way to Malankara.

Commemoration
The Government Stanley Medical College in Chennai (Madras), Tamil Nadu, India is named in memory of Stanley. The Diploma in Medicine and Surgery program was inaugurated here in 1933 by Stanley when he was the Governor of Madras. The college formerly known as Royapuram Medical School was renamed Stanley Medical School on 27 March 1934 in his honour. It was renamed to Stanley Medical College in 1938.

Notes

References

External links 
 

1872 births
1938 deaths
Younger sons of earls
Honourable Artillery Company officers
British Army personnel of the Second Boer War
British Army personnel of World War I
Members of the Privy Council of the United Kingdom
Knights Grand Commander of the Order of the Star of India
Knights Grand Commander of the Order of the Indian Empire
Companions of the Order of St Michael and St George
Conservative Party (UK) MPs for English constituencies
UK MPs 1910
UK MPs 1910–1918
UK MPs 1918–1922
UK MPs 1924–1929
People educated at Wellington College, Berkshire
Graduates of the Royal Military Academy, Woolwich
George